GNU variants (also called GNU distributions or distros for short) are operating systems based upon the GNU operating system (the Hurd kernel, the GNU C library, system libraries and application software like GNU coreutils, bash, GNOME, the Guix package manager, etc). According to the GNU project and others, these also include most operating systems using the Linux kernel and a few others using BSD-based kernels.

GNU users usually obtain their operating system by downloading GNU distributions, which are available for a wide variety of systems ranging from embedded devices (for example, LibreCMC) and personal computers (for example, Debian GNU/Hurd) to powerful supercomputers (for example, Rocks Cluster Distribution).

Hurd kernel 

Hurd is the official kernel developed for the GNU system (before Linux-libre also became an official GNU package). Debian GNU/Hurd was discussed for a release as technology preview with Debian 7.0 Wheezy, however these plans were discarded due to the immature state of the system. However the maintainers of Debian GNU/Hurd decided to publish an unofficial release on the release date of Debian 7.0. Debian GNU/Hurd is not considered yet to provide the performance and stability expected from a production system. Among the open issues are incomplete implementation of Java and X.org graphical user interfaces and limited hardware driver support. About two thirds of the Debian packages have been ported to Hurd.

Arch Hurd is a derivative work of Arch Linux, porting it to the GNU Hurd system with packages optimised for the Intel P6 architecture. Their goal is to provide an Arch-like user environment (BSD-style init scripts, pacman package manager, rolling releases, and a simple set up) on the GNU Hurd, which is stable enough for at least occasional use. Currently it provides a LiveCD for evaluation purposes and installation guides for LiveCD and conventional installation.

Linux kernel 

The term GNU/Linux or GNU+Linux is used by the FSF and its supporters to refer to an operating system where the Linux kernel is distributed with a GNU system software. Such distributions are the primary installed base of GNU packages and programs and also of Linux. The most notable official use of this term for a distribution is Debian GNU/Linux.

As of 2018, the only GNU variants recommended by the GNU Project for regular use are Linux distributions committed to the Free System Distribution Guidelines; most of which refer to themselves as "GNU/Linux" (like Debian), and actually use a deblobbed version of the Linux kernel (like the Linux-libre kernel) and not the mainline Linux kernel.

BSD kernels 

Debian GNU/kFreeBSD is an operating system for IA-32 and x86-64 computer architectures. It is a distribution of GNU with Debian package management and the kernel of FreeBSD. The k in kFreeBSD is an abbreviation for kernel of, and reflects the fact that only the kernel of the complete FreeBSD operating system is used. The operating system was officially released with Debian Squeeze (6.0) on February 6, 2011. One Debian GNU/kFreeBSD live CD is Ging, which is no longer maintained.

 was an experimental port of GNU user-land applications to NetBSD kernel. No official release of this operating system was made; although work was conducted on ports for the IA-32 and DEC Alpha architectures, it has not seen active maintenance since 2002 and is no longer available for download.

As of September 2020, the GNU Project does not recommend or endorse any BSD operating systems.

OpenSolaris (Illumos) kernel 

Nexenta OS is the first distribution that combines the GNU userland (with the exception of libc; OpenSolaris' libc is used) and Debian's packaging and organisation with the OpenSolaris kernel. Nexenta OS is available for IA-32 and x86-64 based systems. Nexenta Systems, Inc initiated the project and sponsors its continued development.
Nexenta OS is not considered a GNU variant, due to the use of OpenSolaris libc. Multiple Illumos distributions use GNU userland by default.

Darwin kernel

Windows NT kernel 

The Cygwin project is an actively-developed compatibility layer in the form of a C library providing a substantial part of the POSIX API functionality for Windows, as well as a distribution of GNU and other Unix-like programs for such an ecosystem. It was first released in 1995 by Cygnus Solutions (now Red Hat).

In 2016 Microsoft and Canonical added an official compatibility layer to Windows 10 that translates Linux kernel calls into Windows NT ones, the reverse of what Wine does. This allows ELF executables to run unmodified on Windows, and is intended to provide web developers with the more familiar GNU userland on top of the Windows kernel. The combination has been dubbed "Linux for Windows", even though Linux (i.e. the operating system family defined by its common use of the Linux kernel) is absent.

See also

 Comparison of Linux distributions

References

External links
 Arch Hurd
 Superunprivileged.org GNU/Hurd-based Live CD
 Debian GNU/kFreeBSD
 Debian GNU/NetBSD
 #debian-kbsd on OFTC
 Ging live CD

Free software operating systems
variants